Pietronella Peters (1848-1924) was a German painter who specialized in portraits and genre scenes of children.

Biography 
She was born to Pieter Francis Peters, a Dutch landscape painter, and his wife, Heinrike Gertrude née Mali. Her grandfather was a glass painter in Nijmegen and her uncle, Christian Mali, was a well-known animal painter of the Munich School, who lived with her family. Her sister, Anna Peters, became a still-life painter, specializing in flowers.

In addition to her portraits of children, she painted numerous portraits of her extended family members. Peters contributed illustrations to Isabella Braun's Der Mädchen liebstes Buch (1880) as well as publishing a series of portraits: Girls Album.

From 1912 until 1924, she lived with her sisters Anna and Ida. A large collection of her works may be found at the Braith-Mali-Museum in Biberach an der Riß and at Schloss Köngen.

Selected paintings

References

Sources 
Monika Machnicki: Anna Peters. Vorwort zum Katalog zur Ausstellung "Anna Peters 1843 - 1926" im Braith-Mali-Museum in Biberach an der Riß, 1990, 
Herbert Hoffmann, Kurt Diemer: Katalog der Gemälde und Skulpturen, Braith-Mali-Museum, Biberach an der Riß, 1975

External links 

 Pietronella Peters: Die junge Künstlerin Anna Peters an der Staffelei. (c.1870) @ Kunstmarkt.com
 ArtNet: More works by  Peters.

1848 births
1924 deaths
19th-century German painters
20th-century German painters
German women painters
German genre painters
Artists from Stuttgart
20th-century German women artists
19th-century German women artists